Family with sequence 98, member C or FAM98C is a gene that encodes for FAM98C has two aliases FLJ44669 and hypothetical protein LOC147965. FAM98C has two paralogs in humans FAM98A and FAM98B. FAM98C can be characterized for being a Leucine-rich protein. The function of FAM98C is still not defined. FAM98C has orthologs in mammals, reptiles, and amphibians and has a distant orhtologs in Rhinatrema bivittatum and Nanorana parkeri.

Gene

Locus 
The FAM98C gene is located on 19q13.2 in humans on the "+" strand. FAM98C spans from 38,403,135 to 38,409,088 bp. The primary mRNA transcript for the FAM98C gene is 5,954 base pairs in length. FAM98C neighbors include RASGRP4 and RYR1.

Transcripts 
FAM98C has two known transcript variants.  The first variant encodes for the longest isoform of 349 amino acids. The second variant is encodes for a short isoform of 267 amino acids. FAM98C is composed of eight exons.

Proteins 
The FAM98C protein is 349 amino acids in length with a predicted molecular weight of 37.3 kDa and a predicted isoelectric point of 6.89. Composition of FAM89A protein is notable for is its abundance of Leucine(16%) and the Lysine-rich C-terminus. FAM98C shows a high scoring positive segment with 6 consecutive Lysine residues.

Domains and motifs 
FAM98C has a domain of unknown function 2465 (DUF2465) from the amino acids 18-334.  This domain of unknown function is unique to the FAM98 family and is conserved in all orthologs. DUF2465 is fairly unknown but its proposed to bind to RNA. The domain in paralogs FAM98A binds to mRNA, FAM98B targets tRNA splicing.

Structure 
The secondary structure of FAM98C is predicted to be composed of approximately 46% alpha helix, 46% random coil and 7% extended strand.  However, no beta strands were found in any of the predicted secondary structures. The tertiary structure of FAM98C is predicted to have 10 alpha helices by the I-TASSER software.

Gene level regulation

Promoter 
The FAM98C promoter(GXP_7536558)  region is 1254 base pairs in length. Both E2F-myc activator/cell cycle regulator and Krueppel like transcription factors had nineteen sites predicted to bind on the promoter.

Expression pattern 
A GEO multiple normal tissue profile revealed that FAM98C is ubiquitously expressed, though not uniformly expressed. The highest expressions levels are in the jejunum, liver, and kidney.

Sub-cellular localization 
The subcellular localization of FAM98C was predicted using the PSORT II tool. FAM98C is predicted to be localized in the nucleus (60.9%), followed by the mitochondria (21.7%) and then the cytoplasm (17.4%).

Protein level regulation

Post-translational modifications

Phosphorylation 
FAM98C has three predicted phosphorylation sites located at amino acid positions 225, 239, and 300 that are conserved in distant orthologs. The predicted phosphorylation site at position 225 is Tyrosine Kinase can function as an "on" and "off" switch. A predicted calmodulin-dependent protein kinase site at position 239.

SUMOylation 
Sumoylation is a post-translation modification process, that regulates a lot of proteins. The GPS CUCKOO workgroup database predicted SUMO protein sites at 347, 348 and 349. These residues were conserved in even the most distant FAM98C orthologs.

Homology

Paralogs 
FAM98C only has two paralogs FAM98A and FAM98B.

Orthologs 
Orthologs for FAM98C have been found in mammals, reptiles and amphibians. FAM98C’s orthologs are present as far back as amphibians roughly estimated 351.8 million years ago(mya). FAM98C is only present in the Metazoan kingdom but not present in protozoa. Below is a table of a variety of orthologs for human FAM98C. The orthologs listed below are in descending order in the terms of the date of divergence.

Rate of Evolution 
FAM98C is rapidly evolving with a rate of divergence faster than both cytochrome C, a slowly evolving gene, and fibrinogen, a rapidly evolving gene.

Interacting proteins 

FAM98C has been predicted to interact with DR1, LRRCC1, FAM83F, TMEM256, Pdrm16 and SPRED1.  LRRCC1 and TMEM256 were both mentioned with FAM98C as potentially novel genes that are related with ciliopathies.

Clinical significance 
In a bioinformatics study, FAM98C and 9 other novel genes were identified to be  associated with a prognosis of cholangiocarcinoma.

References